This is a sortable list of defunct minor baseball leagues in the United States. Minor league affiliated Canadian leagues are also listed.

List